Jeff Quinn (born September 26, 1962) is an American football coach. He was formerly an assistant coach at the University of Notre Dame. Quinn served as the head football coach at the University at Buffalo from 2010 to 2014. He was the 24th head coach in University at Buffalo football history. He replaced Turner Gill who left for Kansas following the 2009 season.  Quinn served as interim head coach at Central Michigan University in 2006 and at the University of Cincinnati in 2009, following the resignation of Brian Kelly in both instances.

Playing career
Quinn graduated from Elmhurst College in 1984 with a bachelor's degree in education. At Elmhurst, he played both offensive line in football and wrestled as a heavyweight. He was named NCAA Division III All-American third team following his senior season. He also won two College Conference of Illinois and Wisconsin championships as a wrestler and was inducted into Elmhurst's Athletic Hall of Fame in 1993.

Coaching career
Quinn has been a college football coach for 26 years, 21 of which have been as an assistant to Brian Kelly at Grand Valley State, Central Michigan, Cincinnati, and Notre Dame. Quinn coached at DePauw University, where he earned a master's degree in educational leadership, and Ohio Northern University before moving on to Grand Valley State. Quinn followed Kelly to Central Michigan, then followed him again to Cincinnati, where he served as the offensive coordinator and offensive line coach.  Quinn was a finalist for the 2009 Broyles Award, an award given to college football's best assistant coach. He served as an interim head coach for the 2006 Motor City Bowl (which he coached for Central Michigan after Kelly left for the head coaching job at Cincinnati) and the 2010 Sugar Bowl (which he coached for Cincinnati after Kelly left for Notre Dame).
  
In December 2009, Quinn was tapped to replace Turner Gill for the University at Buffalo. After coaching Cincinnati to a loss in the Sugar Bowl Quinn officially began his duties as a head coach.
Quinn led the Bulls to their second bowl game in the team's history, they lost the 2013 Famous Idaho Potato Bowl. After a mediocre start in the 2014 season Quinn was relieved of his duties.  Hired by Brian Kelly in 2015, he was an assistant coach for the Notre Dame football team until 2021.

Head coaching record

References

External links
 Notre Dame profile

1962 births
Living people
American football offensive linemen
Buffalo Bulls football coaches
Central Michigan Chippewas football coaches
Cincinnati Bearcats football coaches
DePauw Tigers football coaches
Elmhurst Bluejays football players
Grand Valley State Lakers football coaches
Notre Dame Fighting Irish football coaches
Ohio Northern Polar Bears football coaches